Heatherlands may refer to:

 Heatherlands, Poole, a suburb in England
 Heatherlands, Western Cape, in Australia